Renta or de la Renta is a surname. Notable people with the surname include:

Luis Álvarez Renta
Beatriz Renta

Oscar de la Renta
Salina de la Renta
José Ortiz de la Renta
Annette de la Renta
Giraldo González de la Renta
José Casimiro Ortíz de la Renta
Francisco Ortíz de la Renta

See also